Kula Gotralu is a 1961 Indian Telugu-language drama film written and directed by K. Pratyagatma. It stars Akkineni Nageswara Rao and Krishna Kumari, with music composed by S. Rajeswara Rao. Acharya Aatreya wrote the dialogues for the film. It was produced by A. V. Subba Rao under the Prasad Art Pictures banner.

The film won the National Film Award for Best Feature Film in Telugu certificate of merit in 1963. Noted actor Krishna played a sidekick role in the movie before becoming an established actor.

Plot
The film begins in a village where Zamindar Bhushayya (Gummadi) holds high esteem and adheres to caste and clan. He leads a happy family life with his wife Santamma (Nirmalamma), two daughters Jagadamba (Suryakantham) and Leela (Girija), and a son Ravi (Akkineni Nageswara Rao). Since Jagadamba is the step-daughter of Santamma she always shows resentment toward them and her Sadanandam (Relangi) a loaf, also stays with them.

At present, Ravi moves to the city for higher studies where he falls for a medic Saroja (Krishna Kumari). Just as, he learns that Saroja's mother Kanthamma (G. Varalakshmi) is betrayed by an impostor Chalapati (Mikkilineni) for which they are blacklisted by society. Nevertheless, Ravi rides out courageously and marries Saroja without the acceptance of Bhushayya. So, he is shunned by him.

Thereafter, Ravi becomes a Police Officer and the wheel of fortune makes him land in his hometown. Now he resides as a neighbor of their family friend Ramanayya (Ramana Reddy). As follows, Bhushayya fixes a rich alliance for Leela which has been called off by perceiving Ravi's marriage. During that plight, to keep himself at save face, Bhushayya couple up Leela with Ramanayya's elder brother's son Joga Rao (Padmanabham). Exploiting it, Jagadamba and Sadanandam create the rift between Ravi and Bhushayya.

Meanwhile, Santamma becomes terminally ill and requests Bhushayya to call Ravi when Sadanandam deceives by claiming refusal of Ravi which leads to her death. Angered Bhushayya bans Ravi even to the funeral. Time passes, and Saroja gives birth to a baby boy when the love blossoms in Bhushayya and secretly visits to bless the child.

Being aware of it, Jagadamba and Sadanandam connive by enrolling with Chalapathi, currently, a huge burglar. But unfortunately, he double-crosses Sadanandam and plans a robbery. Sensing it, Ravi rushes along with Saroja and in the combat, Saroja knocks out her father to protect her in-laws when Bhushayya understands the virtue of Saroja. Eventually, Jagadamba and Sadanandam also realize their mistake. Finally, the movie ends on a happy note with the reunion of the family.

Cast
 Akkineni Nageswara Rao as Ravi
 Krishna Kumari as Saroja
 Gummadi as Bhushayya
 Relangi as Sadanandam
 Ramana Reddy as Ramanayya
 Padmanabham as J. J. Rao / Jasthi Joga Rao 
 Allu Ramalingaiah as Peeramma
 Raja Babu as Ravi's friend
 Mikkilineni as Chalapati
 Krishna as Bridegroom in marriage
 Suryakantam as Jagadamba
 G. Varalakshmi as Kanthamma
 Girija as Leela
 Sandhya as Anasuya 
 Nirmalamma as Santhamma

Music 

Music was composed by S. Rajeswara Rao.

Production
It is the first film to be shot at Visakhapatnam.

Awards
National Film Awards
 1962: Certificate of Merit for the Second Best Feature Film in Telugu

References

External links
 

1962 films
1960s Telugu-language films
Films scored by S. Rajeswara Rao
Best Telugu Feature Film National Film Award winners
Films directed by Kotayya Pratyagatma